The card game auction bridge was the third step in the evolution of the general game of bridge. It was developed from bridge whist in 1904, possibly by 1900. Auction bridge was the precursor to contract bridge. Its predecessors were whist and bridge whist.

Auction bridge trick scoring, bonus scoring, and penalty scoring are radically different from contract bridge, and there is no concept of vulnerability in auction bridge.

Bidding rules are nearly the same, although in contract bridge bidding, many complex artificial bids and bidding systems have evolved.

Origin
It is not certain to whom auction bridge should be credited. A letter in The Times (London), January 16, 1905, signed by Oswald Crawfurd, describes auction bridge as first played in 1904, while a book by "John Doe" (Francis Reginald Roe), published in Allahabad, India, in 1899, puts forward auction bridge as an invention of three members of the Indian Civil Service stationed at an isolated community, designed as a three-handed form of bridge to compensate the lack of a fourth player. Their key contribution was the concept of competitive bidding for the declaration.

Play
The bidding, play and laws are similar to contract bridge.

The dealer opens the bidding and must declare to win at least the odd trick in a trump suit or at No-trump; they cannot pass the bid.
A bid is higher if it contracts for a higher number of points (ignoring doubles) rather than a higher number of tricks. As an example 3 (27 points) beats 4 (24 points).

Scoring
Auction bridge scoring is as follows:
 Each trick exceeding six scores: 
 No-trump: 10 points
 Spades: 9 points
 Hearts: 8 points
 Diamonds: 7 points
 Clubs: 6 points
 Game is 30 points, and only odd-tricks count towards game. The first side to win two games wins the rubber and scores a 250-point bonus.
 Each under-trick is worth 50 points to the opponents.
 Small slam is worth 50 points; grand slam is worth 100 points.
 Honours are scored as follows:
 Four trump honours in one hand: 80
 Five trump honours (or four aces in notrump) in one hand: 100
 For an additional honour in partner's hand, or for three or more honours divided between both hands: 10 each
 Contracts could be doubled and redoubled, which doubled or quadrupled the odd-trick and under-trick amounts. In addition there was a bonus of 50 points for making a doubled contract and for each over-trick, this was doubled if the contract was redoubled.

See also
Russian whist

References

External links

Rules of Card Games: Bridge
THE LAWS OF AUCTION BRIDGE (1908)

Contract bridge
Card games introduced in 1904